European Champion Clubs' Cup is the cup awarded to the winners of the UEFA Champions League. 

European Champion Clubs' Cup may also refer to:

 The original name of the UEFA Champions League
 European Champion Clubs Cup (athletics)